The Commander is a British crime drama, broadcast on ITV1, starring Amanda Burton as the principal character, Commander Clare Blake. The series first broadcast on 16 February 2003, and a total of five series were produced over a five-year-period, with the last episode airing on 12 November 2008.

The series focuses on Blake, the leader of an elite murder investigation squad in London. Throughout the series, Blake has two main sidekicks. Matthew Marsh starred in the first four series as DCI Mike Hedges, and following his decision to quit the role, he was replaced by Mark Lewis Jones, who appears in the final two seasons as DCI Doug James.

The series has been released on DVD in the UK via Contender Entertainment Group and Acorn Media UK. In the United States, all five series have been issued in two double DVD sets, again via Acorn Media.

Plot
The Commander focuses on Clare Blake, leader of an elite murder investigative squad based in London, who allows her interpersonal relationships to cloud her judgement, and who, on several occasions, makes bad calls which are detrimental to an investigation. Midway through the series run, Ofcom and ITV received many complaints from viewers over Blake's willingness to sleep with suspects so that evidence can be gained from them - exemplified in her relationship with murderer James Lampton (Hugh Bonneville). Many viewers said that as much as the story was fictional, such action was so far out that it could not possibly be considered believable or true to life.

Cast
 Amanda Burton as Commander Clare Blake 
 Matthew Marsh as D.C.I. Mike Hedges (Series 1—3)
 Nicholas Jones as D.C.S. Les Branton (Series 1 & Series 4)
 Pip Torrens as D.C.S. Les Branton (Series 2)
 Christopher Robbie as D.A.C. Edward Sumpter (Series 1)
 Anthony Valentine as D.A.C. Edward Sumpter (Series 2—5)
 Tristan Gemmill as D.I. Ken Miles (Series 1)
 Thomas Lockyer as D.I. Ken Miles (Series 2)
 David O'Hara as D.C.C. Stephen Blackton (Series 3)
 Robert Wilfort as D.I. Jeff Dunn (Series 1)
 Mark Lewis Jones as D.C.I. Doug James (Series 4—5)
 Paul Brightwell as D.S. Brian Hall
 Poppy Miller as D.C./D.I. Carol Browning (Series 1—2)
 Monica Dolan as D.C. Pamela Hayes (Series 3-4)
 Nadine Marshall as D.C. Alison Goody (Series 4)
 Connie Hyde as D.C.I. Janet Chambers (Series 4)
 Niall MacGregor as D.S. Matt Newton (Series 5)
 Sian Brooke as D.C. Marion Randell (Series 5)

Notable Guest Appearances 

 Amanda Boxer as Margaret Tubbs (Blackdog, Series 2)
 Nicholas Ball as John Dawson (Blackdog, Series 2)
 Brendan Coyle as Carl Dirkwood (Blacklight, Series 3)
 Pippa Haywood as Helen Dirkwood (Blacklight, Series 3)
 Matt Day as Eric Thornton (The Devil You Know, Series 4)
 Celia Imrie as Mrs. Thornton (The Devil You Know, Series 4)
 Simon Williams as John Thornton (The Devil You Know, Series 4)
 Blake Ritson as John Littlewood (The Devil You Know, Series 4)
 Abigail Cruttenden as Judy Thornton (The Devil You Know, Series 4)
 Adam James as Tony Lattice (The Devil You Know, Series 4)
 Penny Downie as Jane Griffith (The Fraudster, Series 4)
 Oliver Cotton as Donald Griffith (The Fraudster, Series 4)
 Greg Wise as Mark Davy (The Fraudster, Series 4)
 Adrian Scarborough as Clive Seway (The Fraudster, Series 4)
 Priyanga Burford as Miranda Kent (The Fraudster, Series 4)
 Ayesha Dharker as Grace Kandola (The Fraudster, Series 4)
 Elisabeth Dermot Walsh as Thelma Field (The Fraudster, Series 4)
 Gerard Kearns as Terry Donnolly (Windows of the Soul, Series 4)
 Gary Stretch as Jack Bannerman (Windows of the Soul, Series 4)
 Toby Kebbell as Jimmy Bannerman (Windows of the Soul, Series 4)
 Sara Stockbridge as Lisa Bannerman (Windows of the Soul, Series 4)
 David Sterne as Father Thomas Martin (Windows of the Soul, Series 4)
 Christopher Fulford as Denny Wade (Windows of the Soul, Series 4)
 Valerie Lilley as Brenda O'Hare (Windows of the Soul, Series 4)
 James D'Arcy as Jerry (Abduction, Series 5)
 Claire Skinner as Fiona (Abduction, Series 5)
 Caroline Blakiston as Mary Henson (Abduction, Series 5)
 Kerrie Hayes as Sharon Davis (Abduction, Series 5)
 Ella Kenion as Helen Gordon (Abduction, Series 5)
 Dilys Laye as Edna Sutton (Abduction, Series 5)
 Al Murray as Betting Shop Boss (Abduction, Series 5)

Episode list

Series 1 (2003)
The series began with a one-off feature-length story broadcast in two parts in February 2003. Only known as The Commander for television broadcast, it did not carry an official title until the joint DVD release of series one and two in 2005. The episode gained enough viewers for two more stories to be commissioned. The other investigating officers in this episode are DCI Mike Hedges (Matthew Marsh), DCS Les Branton (Nicholas Jones), DAC Edward Sumpter (Christopher Robbie), DI Ken Miles (Tristan Gemmill), DS Brian Hall (Paul Brightwell) and DC Carol Browning (Poppy Miller).

Series 2 (2005)
The second series of The Commander was first broadcast in 2005. The series was released on a joint DVD in 2005 with the first series. The same roster of characters appear in the second series as the first, with slight changes to the cast. Thomas Lockyer takes over the role of DI Ken Miles, Pip Torrens takes over the role of DCS Les Branton, Ron Donachie takes over the role of George Hart, and Anthony Valentine takes over the role of DAC Edward Sumpter. Carol Browning (Poppy Miller) is also promoted to DI.

Series 3 (2006)
The third installment of the series was first broadcast in 2006, again in the form of one feature length story, split into two parts. Series three has never been released on DVD in the United Kingdom, having been broadcast between the release of the first DVD set released by Contender, and the second released by Acorn Media UK who only acquired the rights in 2007. Monica Dolan joins the cast as DC Pamela Hayes, following the departure of DI Carol Browning. DCS Les Branton does not appear in the series.

Series 4 (2007)
The fourth series of The Commander was first broadcast in 2007, in the form of three separate stories each broadcast in two parts. The entire series was released on DVD in 2007 by Acorn Media UK, becoming the last series to be released on DVD in the United Kingdom. This series introduces two new characters to the cast: DCI Doug James (Mark Lewis Jones), and DC Alison Goody (Nadine Marshall), leaving Amanda Burton, Anthony Valentine and Paul Brightwell as the only remaining original cast members. Les Branton also makes a return to the series, this time however played by the original actor, Nicholas Jones.

Series 5 (2008)
The fifth and final installment of the series was first broadcast in 2008, in the form of three separate episodes comprising one story. Abduction becomes the second series of The Commander not released on DVD in the United Kingdom. The series also introduces a further new cast: DS Matt Newton (Niall MacGregor) and DC Marion Randell (Sian Brooke), who join Amanda Burton, Anthony Valentine, Mark Lewis Jones and Paul Brightwell, whose character DS Brian Hall has been suspended from the force.

External links

2003 British television series debuts
2008 British television series endings
ITV television dramas
Television shows set in London
2000s British drama television series
British detective television series
English-language television shows